Stadium Negara is an indoor arena located in Kuala Lumpur, Malaysia.

Background 
Stadium Negara is located about 2 kilometers from Kuala Lumpur City Centre, next to the Stadium Merdeka and Merdeka 118 building.

The stadium, which has 10,000 permanent seats, is fully air conditioned and is capable of housing many different types of events, including sports events and concerts.

Facilities 
 VIP Holding room
 Media Centre
 Sport Facilities
 Existing Ticketing Booths
 In-house provide Air-conditioning

History 
The construction of the stadium began in 1960 and it was officially opened on 10 April 1962 by the third Yang di-Pertuan Agong, Tuanku Syed Putra. It was the first indoor stadium in Malaysia.

The stadium was renovated thrice in 1982, 1985 and 2015.

Major events

Miss World Malaysia 20 April 1963
The Bee Gees 1972 Stadium Negara
Santana Caravanserai Tour 19 July 1973
Gillan (band) 2 August 1982. It is said to have been the first hard rock and heavy metal concert in Malaysia.
Tina Turner, Break Every Rule World Tour 24–25 February 1988
Eric Clapton 26 November 1990
Asian Taekwondo Championships 31 January 1992
Kylie Minogue, Rhythm of Love Tour 3 March 1991
Gloria Estefan, Into the Light World Tour November 1991   
 Paula Abdul, Under My Spell Tour  22 February 1992
Rothmans, Thomas Cup/Uber Cup and Malaysia 1992
Holiday on Ice November 1992
Sting 2 February 1994
Cliff Richard, The Hit List Tour 9 January 1995
Bon Jovi, These Days Tour 4 May 1995
Faye Wong Live in Concert 9–10 November 1995
Def Leppard, Slang World Tour 4 June 1996
Slam: Konsert Grand Slam Unplugged 3 August 1996
Sarah Brightman, Harem World Tour 20 June 2004
INXS, Switch Tour  18 August 2006
Muse, Black Holes and Revelations Tour 25 February 2007
TVXQ 24 November 2007
Kanye West 2007
Jason Mraz 2009
Disney on Ice
JYJ 17 October 2010
Digi Live KPOP Party 2011 13 January 2011
Incubus 23 July 2011
David Archuleta 26 July 2011
2PM 25 November 2011
F.T. Island 14 January 2012
The Cranberries 4 April 2012
Sum 41, Does This Look Infected?: 10th Anniversary Tour 14 April 2012
Sandy Lam MMXII Concert 28 July 2012
Wonder Girls 13 October 2012
Jonas Brothers, Jonas Brothers World Tour 24 October 2012
The Jacksons, Unity Tour 13 December 2012
Paramore, The Self-Titled Tour 17 February 2013
 CNBLUE: Blue Moon World Tour 24 August 2013
Infinite, One Great Step  19 October 2013
2NE1: AON: All or Nothing World Tour 24 May 2014
CNBLUE: Can't Stop Concert 9 August 2014
SIIMA Awards: 3rd South Indian International Movie Awards 12–13 September 2014
Pet Shop Boys: Electric Tour 24 September 2014
Running Man: Race Start! Running Man Fan Meeting Asia Tour Season 2 1 November 2014
Taeyang Rise World Tour 8 February 2015
Backstreet Boys, In a World Like This Tour 3 May 2015
Pentatonix, On My Way Home Tour 30 May 2015
Dato' Siti Nurhaliza & Friends Concert 2 April 2016
iKon: iKoncert 2016: Showtime Tour 13 August 2016
Megadeth Dystopia World Tour April 2017
Seventeen (band) Seventeen 1st World Tour "Diamond Edge" 9 September 2017
Wanna One Wanna One 1st Fan Meeting in Kuala Lumpur "Wanna Be Loved" 19 January 2018

Gallery

See also
 Sport in Malaysia

References

External links 
 SPEECH BY DEPUTY PRIME MINISTER AT THE OPENING OF STADIUM NEGARA, KUALA LUMPUR ON 19TH APRIL, 1962, PERDANA Library.
Merdeka 118 Precinct : Stadium Negara website

Indoor arenas in Malaysia
Sports venues in Kuala Lumpur
Sports venues completed in 1962
Music venues completed in 1962
1962 establishments in Malaya
Basketball venues in Malaysia
Taekwondo venues